Green Key International is an international eco-label awarded to accommodations and other hospitality facilities that commit to sustainable business practices. Awarded establishments comply with strict criteria, independently verified through regular on-site audits.

It aims to contribute to the prevention of climate change by awarding and advocating facilities with positive environmental initiatives. Green Key is a non-governmental, non-profit, independent programme operating under the umbrella organisation of the Foundation for Environmental Education, FEE. The programme is recognised and supported by the World Tourism Organization, WTO and United Nations Environmental Programme, UNEP. Green Key has an international programme administration at the FEE Head Office in Copenhagen and Green Key National Operators in most member countries implementing the programme on national levels.

Green Key is one of the largest eco-labels for the hospitality industry worldwide and currently has more than 3,200 awarded hotels and other establishments in 65 countries.

Aims 
Green Key aims to

  Increase the use of environmentally friendly and sustainable methods of operation and technology in the establishments and thereby reduce the overall use of resources. 
  Raise awareness and create behavioural changes in guests, staff and suppliers of individual tourism establishments.
  Increase the use of environmentally friendly and sustainable methods and raise awareness to create behavioural changes in the hospitality and tourism industry overall.

History 
Green Key International began in Denmark in 1994 and was adopted by the Foundation for Environmental Education in 2002 to become its fifth international partner. It has since spread to nearly 65 countries and continues to grow in number and reach across the world.

Commercial websites, such as Bookdifferent.com, is partnering with Green Key to entice travelers to book eco friendly hotels.

Criteria 
Tourism facilities awarded a Green Key adhere to national or international Green Key criteria. The criteria have been designed to be easily understood by travellers, feasible for the tourism industry, and clearly verifiable through control checks.

International criteria reflect the various fields of tourism facilities (hotels, hostels, camp sites, conference and holiday centres, tourist attractions and restaurants) and specialized national criteria reflect each country's legislation, infrastructure and culture.

The criteria focus on environmental management, technical demands and initiatives for the involvement of guests, staff and suppliers. Some of the categories covered are: Water, Waste, Energy, Involvement and Awareness of Guests, Environmental Management, Staff Involvement, Use of Chemicals, Open Spaces, and Food and Beverages.

Five pillars 
The Green Key programme rests on five pillars:

  Education of staff, clients and owners towards increased sustainable development and environmental awareness in leisure establishments;
  Environmental preservation by the reduction of the environmental impact of each establishment in the world scene;
  Economical management by the reduction of consumption meaning a reduction of costs; 
  Marketing strategy by the promotion of the Green Key label and the establishments using the Green Key icon;
  Strengthening of the tourism and leisure branch by taking responsibility broader than then their individual establishments.

Global Forest Fund 
The Foundation for Environmental Education, which runs the Green Key Programme, uses a tool to compensate their  emissions from flight travels. The funds are distributed by the programme Learning about Forests (LEAF), which involves children in planting tree activities.

Similar certifications 
Green Globe is a similar program offering a certification process for the hospitality industry.

References

Sustainable tourism
Environmental standards

de:Stiftung für Umwelterziehung#Der Grüne Schlüssel (Green Key)